Cebu Technological University, abbreviated as CTU and also known as Cebu Tech, is a public, non-sectarian, coeducational, state-funded higher education institution located in Cebu, Philippines. CTU was originally a part of the Philippine public high school system and traces its roots to the Manual Arts department of the Cebu Normal School (now the Cebu Normal University), and was founded independently in 1911 as the Cebu Trade School. In 1928, the institution opened its own campus near the Port of Cebu, where its main campus still stands today.

The university, since its founding in 1911, was also previously known as Cebu Trade School, Cebu School of Arts and Trades, and Cebu State College of Science and Technology, until, in 2009, by the virtue of Republic Act 9744, it was converted into a state university, and assuming the name Cebu Technological University.

The CTU system counts a total of 23 campuses, which consists of one main campus in Cebu City, nine satellite campuses, and 13 extension campuses. As of school year 2019–20, there are 41,395 students enrolled on the 23 CTU campuses located throughout the province of Cebu.

In 2020, CTU became the first university in Cebu to be awarded an overall rating of three stars by global higher education analyst Quacquarelli Symonds (QS) Stars team, following CHED’s announcement of being one of the grantees of the “Fostering World Class Philippines Universities Project” in July 2019. The following year, in 2022, CTU was ranked in the 651+ bracket of the Quacquarelli Symonds (QS) Asian University Rankings. In 2022, CTU was given reporter status in the Times Higher Education World University Rankings, marking its inclusion to the prestigious list for the first time. Spain-based Cybermetrics Lab also ranks CTU in its Webometrics Ranking of World Universities, placing it 11th in the Philippines in the said ranking.

History

Early history
The university traces its roots way back in 1901, to the Manual Arts department of the Cebu Normal School. When the Cebu Normal School phased out its Secondary Normal Curriculum, the institution became affiliated with the Cebu Provincial High School across the street (now the Abellana National School). It was part of many trade schools that were introduced in the Philippines during the American colonial period, designed to develop technical skills for domestic- as well as commercially-viable arts and crafts.

In 1911, Cebu Trade School set up shop as an independent school and employed two American and three Filipino teachers who taught in the fifth, sixth and seventh grades. It eventually produced the first batch of intermediate trade graduates in 1912.

Through Proclamation No. 180, on August 20, 1928, the Cebu Trade School became a separate entity and acquired its present site, along Los Martires Street (now the M.J. Cuenco Avenue), Cebu City, close to the Port of Cebu. The Cebu Trade School Building was built to house the fledgling institution and was constructed near the waterfront, and can be described as a neoclassical structure with each column on its façade topped by a distinct statue representing human symbols of the arts and trades. The building still stands as of the present day, but is in a deep state of neglect, hidden by a concrete perimeter fence and newer buildings in the main campus.

In 1940, the Cebu Trade School was renamed as Cebu School of Arts and Trades (CSAT) by virtue of the operation of Commonwealth Act No. 313. That same year, it offered the two-year technical course for male students.

World War II and the following years
World War II caused extensive damages to the buildings within the Los Martires campus, and the buildings left intact were occupied by the American troops. On August 1, 1945, after the war, CSAT reopened its doors in makeshift classrooms on bodegas along General Maxilom Street (formerly Mango Avenue) and General Echavez Street. Classes in the Los Martires campus resumed on January 1, 1947 just after the American troops had left.

In 1950, CSAT opened its doors to female students and saw the opening of secondary courses; the two-year Teacher Arts and Trades course for girls, and the two-year Trade Technical Education curriculum. Four years later, in 1954, CSAT offered its first four-year course offering, the Bachelor of Science in Industrial Education.

Integration into a state college
By virtue of Batas Pambansa Bilang 412 on June 10, 1983, CSAT, along with nine other local public schools around the province of Cebu, were integrated into a new state college system, to be called the Cebu State College of Science and Technology (CSCST). It was mandated that the new state college "shall expand its curricular programs focusing on higher technological education". The integrated local colleges include:
 Cebu School of Arts and Trades in Cebu City
 Sudlon Agricultural College in Lahug, Cebu City
 Abellana National School in Cebu City
 Danao Vocational School in Danao
 Tuburan Vocational School in Tuburan
 Moalboal School of Fisheries in Moalboal
 Argao Agro-Industrial School in Argao
 Quirino School of Fisheries in Carmen
 Manuel A. Roxas Memorial School of Fisheries in Daanbantayan
 Magsaysay School of Fisheries in San Francisco, Camotes Islands

On December 16, 2003, to fully standardize and to highly institutionalize the entire management of its educational system, Cebu State College of Science and Technology was granted Certificate of Registration by Anglo-Japanese American (AJA) Registrars Incorporated in accordance with ISO 9001:2000 Quality Management System Standards, with Certification No. AJA 03/6952 giving it international recognition. On October 8, 2009 the CSCST's QMS was recertified compliant to the new version, ISO 9001:2008 standards by the Anglo-Japanese American (AJA) Registrars Inc., and on November 26, 2018 the university QMS earned its certification of the ISO 9001:2015 standards by the TUV Rheinland.

University status and global competitiveness
By virtue of Republic Act No. 9744, CSCST eventually became a state university on November 10, 2009, and adopting its current name Cebu Technological University (CTU).

In 2020, CTU became the first university in Cebu to be awarded an overall rating of three stars by global higher education analyst Quacquarelli Symonds (QS) Stars team, following CTU being one of the grantees of the Philippine Philippine Commission on Higher Education (CHED) program of “Fostering World Class Philippines Universities Project” in July 2019. The following year, in 2021, CTU was ranked in the 651+ bracket of the Quacquarelli Symonds (QS) Asian University Rankings for 2022., and was also given reporter status in the Times Higher Education World University Rankings.

Campuses
The Cebu Technological University system has 23 campuses spread throughout Cebu. It consists of one (1) main campus in Cebu City, nine (9) satellite campuses, and thirteen (13) extension campuses.

Main
 CTU Main (Cebu City)

Satellite
 CTU Argao
 CTU Barili
 CTU Carmen
 CTU Cebu Mountain Satellite Campus
 CTU Consolacion
 CTU Daanbantayan
 CTU Danao
 CTU Moalboal
 CTU Tuburan
 CTU San Francisco

Extension
 CTU Bantayan
 CTU Dumanjug
 CTU Ginatilan
 CTU Malabuyoc
 CTU Naga
 CTU Oslob
 CTU Pinamungajan
 CTU San Fernando
 CTU San Remigio
 CTU Tabogon
 CTU Tabuelan

Administration
The President of Cebu Technological University is selected and appointed by the Board of Regents/Trustees, upon the recommendation of a search committee. The current president is Rosein A. Ancheta Jr.

The Board of Regents (BOR) is the governing board of the University as mandated by law. The administration of Cebu Technological University and the exercise of its corporate powers are vested in the Board of Regents and the President of the University.

Academics
Cebu Technological University offers undergraduate degree programs, graduate programs, special programs, and online programs. These programs are offered in the following colleges of the University:

 College of Arts and Sciences
 College of Computer, Information and Communications Technology
 College of Education
 College of Engineering
 College of Forestry and Agriculture
 College of Management and Entrepreneurship
 College of Technology
 College of Technology Managements

In addition to these colleges, CTU, in consortium with the Cebu City Medical Center, also has an affiliated nursing school, the Cebu Technological University–Cebu City Medical Center (CTU–CCMC) College of Nursing located along D. Jakosalem Street, Cebu City, located not far from the CTU main campus.

Admissions and financial aid

Admission
Admission to CTU is selective. All aspiring students, except for BS Nursing applicants, must take and pass the CTU Entrance Exam. Admission to selected programs is based on test scores, availability of slots, and the student's grade point average in senior high school. Applicants must also have had not obtained any failing grade in the academic year prior to admission, with the exception of degree programs aimed towards persons with disabilities. The Admissions Office of Cebu Technological University caters to student-applicants interested to enroll in the University upon submission of their course and grade requirements and after passing the admission test and interview. Admission tests are administered before the start of the academic year. The university also adopts laws, rules, regulations, and policies of Republic Act No. 9165, also known as the Comprehensive Dangerous Drugs Act of 2002.

BS Nursing is offered through CTU–CCMC College of Nursing, an affilliated school of CTU. As CTU–CCMC is affilliated with Cebu City Medical Center, which is owned by the Cebu City local government, admission is only open for residents or children of registered voters of Cebu City. In addition, applicants must have had not obtained any failing grade in the academic year prior to admission.

In school year 2020–21, CTU admitted a total of 18,145 freshmen students throughout all of its campuses, of which 4,880 were admitted in its main campus in Cebu City.

Tuition and scholarship
Cebu Technological University provides free tuition fee through Republic Act No. 10931, also known as the Universal Access to Quality Tertiary Education Act signed in 2017. The university also provides assistance to qualified students through internal and externally funded scholarships.

Internationalization and ASEAN Integration
CTU has established international connections with universities in six continents: Europe, Asia, Australia, Africa, North America, and South America.

Faculty mobility
Teaching staff of the university have worked in collaboration with foreign educational institutions, such as giving lectures at Dongseo University in South Korea, and marine biology talks at National Sun Yat-sen University in Taiwan.

Student mobility
Students have the opportunity to participate in overseas programs. Some of these include Agriculture programs in Europe and Asia, as well as Hospitality and Management programs in the United States.

References

External links

Universities and colleges in Cebu City
State universities and colleges in the Philippines